This list of the Paleozoic life of Wyoming contains the various prehistoric life-forms whose fossilized remains have been reported from within the US state of Wyoming and are between 538.8 and 252.17 million years of age.

A

 †Acanthopecten
 †Acanthopecten alatus
 †Acanthopecten coloradoensis
 †Acanthopecten delawarensis – or unidentified comparable form
 †Acanthoscorpio – type locality for genus
 †Acanthoscorpio mucronatus – type locality for species
 †Acanthracospirifer
 †Acanthracospirifer occiduus – tentative report
 †Acanthracospirifer shawi
 †Acondylacanthus
 †Acondylacanthus browni – type locality for species
 †Acontiodus
 †Acratia – tentative report
 †Acratia disjuncta
 †Actinoceras
 †Actinocoelia
 †Actinocoelia maeandrina
 †Acuticarpus
 †Acuticarpus delticus
 †Acuticarpus republicensis – type locality for species
 †Adetognathodus
 †Adetognathodus gigantea – or unidentified comparable form
 †Agassizodus
 †Agassizodus variabilis
 †Agnostogonus
 †Agnostogonus incognitus – or unidentified comparable form
 †Allocryptaspis
 †Allocryptaspis ellipticus
 †Allocryptaspis flabelliformis
 †Allumettoceras
 †Alokistocare
 †Amphiscapha
 †Amphiscapha calix – type locality for species
 †Amphissites
 †Amphissites robertsi
 †Amplexus
 †Ananias
 †Ananias nevadensis – or unidentified related form
 †Anarthraspis
 †Anarthraspis chamberlini
 †Anarthraspis montanus
 †Ancistriodus
 †Ancistriodus multisectus
 †Anematina
 †Angulotreta
 †Anidanthus
 †Ankoura
 †Anthracospirifer
 †Anthracospirifer curvilateralis
 †Anthracospirifer occidus
 †Anthracospirifer occiduus
 †Anthracospirifer rawlinsensis
 †Anthracospirifer shawi
 †Anthracospirifer welleri
 †Antiquatonia
 †Antiquatonia coloradoensis – or unidentified comparable form
 †Antiquatonia sulcatus – or unidentified comparable form
 †Antracospirifer
 †Antracospirifer occidus
 †Antracospirifer rawlinsensis
 †Antracospirifer shawi
 †Antracospirifer welleri
 †Apachella
 †Apachella boydi – type locality for species
 †Apachella capertoni
 †Apachella franciscana
 †Apachella pseudostrigillata
 †Apachella turbiniformis
 †Aphanaia
 †Aphanaia erectum – type locality for species
 †Aphelaspis
 †Aphelaspis walcotti
 †Apiculatisporites
 †Apiculatisporites microconus
 †Apiculiretusispora
 †Apiculiretusispora plicata
 †Apiculiretusispora spicula
 †Arapahoia
 †Archaediscus
 †Archaediscus krestovnikovi – or unidentified loosely related form
   †Archaeocidaris
 †Arctacanthus
 †Arctacanthus wyomingensis – type locality for species
 †Asphaltina
 †Astartella
 †Astartella aueri – type locality for species
 †Astartella concentrica
 †Asteroarchaediscus
 †Asteroarchaediscus bachkiricus
  †Astraspis
 †Astraspis desiderata
  †Aviculopecten
 †Aviculopecten basilicus – or unidentified comparable form
 †Aviculopecten girtyi
 †Aviculopecten gravidus
 †Aviculopecten gryphus
 †Aviculopecten kaibabensis – or unidentified comparable form
 †Aviculopinna

B

 †Babylonites
 Bairdia
 †Bairdia contracta
 †Bairdia delicata
 †Bairdia nasuta
 †Bakevellia – tentative report
 †Balantoides
 †Balantoides quadrilobatus
 †Baltagnostus
 †Baltagnostus wyomingensis – type locality for species
 †Barytichisma
 †Barytichisma amsdenense
 †Batacanthus
 †Batacanthus gigas – type locality for species
 †Bathymyonia
 †Bathymyonia nevadensis
 †Batostoma
 †Bayfieldia
 †Bayfieldia bindosa
 †Bayfieldia simata – or unidentified comparable form
 †Baylea
 †Baylea delawarensis
  †Bellerophon
 †Bellerophon deflectus – or unidentified comparable form
 †Belodus
 †Bighornia
 †Bighornia parva
 †Bighornia patella
 †Billingsella
 †Billingsella perfecta
 †Biseriella
 †Biseriella moderata
 †Biseriella parva
 †Blountia
 †Blountia cora
 †Blountia janei
 †Blountiella
 †Blountiella alberta
 †Bolaspidella
 †Borestus
 †Bowmania
 †Bowmania pennsylvania
 †Brachythyrina
 †Brachythyrina washakiensis
 †Bradyina – tentative report
 †Branchioscorpio – type locality for genus
 †Branchioscorpio richardsoni – type locality for species
 †Briscoia
 †Broeggeria – tentative report
 †Broeggeria strobiliformis
 †Broggeria – tentative report
 †Broggeria strobiliformis – type locality for species
 †Bryantodina
 †Bryantolepis
 †Bryantolepis brachycephalus
 †Bryantolepis cristatus
 †Bryantolepis major
 †Bryantolepis obscurus
 †Bucheria – type locality for genus
 †Bucheria ovata – type locality for species
 †Bulbocanthus
 †Bulbocanthus rugosus
  †Burnetia
 †Burnetia alta – or unidentified comparable form
 †Bynumia

C

 †Calapoecia
 †Calapoecia coxi
 †Calcisphaera
 †Calcisphaera laevis
 †Calcisphaera pachysphaerica
 †Camaraspis
 †Camaraspis convexa
  †Campodus
 †Camptonectes – tentative report
 †Cancrinella
 †Cancrinella phosphatica
 †Caneyella
  †Caninia
 †Caninia nevadensis
  †Cardipeltis
 †Cardipeltis bryanti
 †Cardipeltis richardsoni
 †Cardipeltis wallacii
 †Carlinia
 †Carlinia amsdeniana
 †Cassianoides
 †Cassianoides sexcostatus – type locality for species
  †Catenipora
 †Catenipora robusta
 †Cavellina
 †Cavellina bransoni
  †Cavusgnathus
 †Cavusgnathus unicornis
  †Cedaria
 †Cedarina
 †Celtoides – type locality for genus
 †Celtoides unioniformis – type locality for species
   †Cephalaspis
 †Cephalaspis wyomingense
 †Ceraunocochlis
 †Chaetetes
 †Chaetetes eximius – or unidentified comparable form
 †Chaetetes wyomingensis
 †Charactoceras – tentative report
 †Cheilocephalus
 †Cheilocephalus delandi
 †Chirognathus
 †Chirognathus alternata
 †Chirognathus curvidens
 †Chirognathus delicatulus
 †Chirognathus monodactyla
 †Chirognathus multidens
 †Chirognathus reversa
 †Chirognathus tenuidentatus
 †Chirognathus unguliformis
 †Chonetes
 †Cibecuia
 †Cibecuia gouldii – or unidentified comparable form
 †Cinclidonema
 †Cinclidonema clausepeakensis – type locality for species
  †Cleiothyridina
 †Cleiothyridina atrypoides
 †Cleiothyridina elegans – or unidentified related form
 †Cleiothyridina hirsuta
 †Cleiothyridina sublamellosa – or unidentified related form
 †Clelandia
 †Clelandia typicalis
 †Cliffa
 †Cliffa lataegenae
 †Cliffia
 †Cliffia lataegenae
 †Climacammina
 †Coelogasteroceras
 †Coelogasteroceras mexicanum
 †Coelogasteroceras thomasi – type locality for species
 †Coleodus
 †Coleodus simplex
 †Colpites
  †Composita
 †Composita elongata
 †Composita laevis – or unidentified related form
 †Composita mira
 †Composita ovata
 †Composita poposiensis
 †Composita sigma
 †Composita subquadrata
 †Composita subtilita
 †Composita sulcata
 †Conocardium
 †Coosella
 †Coosia
 †Coosia alethes
 †Coosina
 †Coosina ariston
 †Cordylodus
 †Cordylodus concinnus – tentative report
 Cornuspira
 †Crassidonta
 †Crassidonta stuckenbergi
 †Crepicephalus
 †Crepicephalus auratus
 †Crepicephalus buttsimontanaensis
 †Crepicephalus rectus
 †Crurithyris
 †Crurithyris arcuata
 †Crurithyris arcuatus
  †Ctenacanthus
 †Ctenacanthus amblyxiphias
 †Ctenacanthus mutabilis – type locality for species
 †Ctenacanthus obscuracostatus – type locality for species
 †Ctenalosia
 †Ctenalosia transversa – type locality for species
 †Cuffeyella
 †Cuffeyella arachnoidea
 †Cupulocrinus
 †Cupulocrinus latibrachiatus – or unidentified comparable form
 †Cyclendoceras
 †Cyclites
 †Cyclites depressus – or unidentified comparable form
 †Cyclospira – tentative report
 †Cyclospira anticostiana
 †Cymbosporites
 †Cymbosporites proteus
 †Cymbosporites senex
 †Cypricardella – tentative report
 †Cyrtogomphoceras
 †Cyrtoniodus
 †Cyrtoniodus complicatus
 †Cyrtoniodus erectus
 †Cyrtorostra
 †Cyrtorostra varicostata – type locality for species
 Cytherella – report made of unidentified related form or using admittedly obsolete nomenclature
 †Cytherella benniei
 †Cytogomphoceras

D

 †Deckera
 †Deckera completa – or unidentified comparable form
 †Delaria
 †Delaria sevilloidia – type locality for species
 †Della
 †Della suada
 †Deltodus
 †Deltodus mercurei
 †Dendrocrinus
 †Densonella
  †Dentalium
 †Derbyia
 †Derbyia magna
 †Derbyia robusta – or unidentified comparable form
 †Diaphragmus
 †Diaphragmus nivosus
 †Dibolisporites
 †Dibolisporites abitibiensis
 †Dibolisporites eifeliensis
 †Dibolisporites wetteldorfensis
 †Dicellomus
 †Dicellomus amblia
 †Diceromyonia
 †Diceromyonia storeya
 †Dictyonina
 †Dictyotomaria
 †Dictyotomaria carlbransoni – type locality for species
 †Dielasma
 †Dielasma fabiforme – type locality for species
 †Diestoceras
 †Dimorphosiphon
 †Dimorphosiphon talbotorum
 †Dinorthis
 †Dinorthis occidentalis
 †Diplosphaerina
 †Distichophytum
 †Distichophytum ovatum
 †Dokimocephalus
 †Donaldina
 †Donaldina pygmaea – or unidentified related form
 †Donaldospira
 †Donaldospira geminocarinata
 †Drepanodos
  †Drepanophycus
 †Drepanophycus devonicus
 †Duncanopora
 †Duncanopora duncanae
 †Dysoristus
 †Dysoristus lochmanae

E

 †Earlandia
 †Earlandia clavatula
 †Earlandia elegans
 †Echinauris
 †Echinauris magna
 †Echinoconchus
 †Ectenocrinus
 †Ectodemites
 †Ectodemites warei
 †Edmondia
 †Edmondia gibbosa
 †Edmondia phosphatica
 †Edmondia phosphoriensis – or unidentified comparable form
 †Edmondia stuchburia
 †Eirlysia
 †Eirlysia reticulata – or unidentified comparable form
 †Elvinia
 †Elvinia roemeri
 †Emphanisporites
 †Emphanisporites micrornatus
 †Emphanisporites rotatus
  †Endoceras
 †Endothyra
 †Endothyra bowmani – or unidentified loosely related form
 †Endothyra excellens
 †Endothyra prisca – or unidentified loosely related form
 †Endothyra similis – or unidentified loosely related form
 †Endothyranella
 †Eoastarte – type locality for genus
 †Eoastarte subcircularis – type locality for species
 †Eocamptonectes
 †Eocamptonectes sculptilis
 †Eochonetes
 †Eochonetes maearum – type locality for species
 †Eoorthis
 †Eoorthis remnicha
 †Eoschubertella
 †Eostaffella
 †Eostaffella acutissima – or unidentified loosely related form
 †Eostaffella circuli
 †Eostaffella pseudostruvei – or unidentified loosely related form
 †Eostaffellina
 †Eostaffellina paraprotvae
 †Eotuberitina
 †Ephippiorthoceras
 †Eriptychius
 †Eriptychius americanus
 †Erismodus
 †Erismodus abbreviatus
 †Erismodus typus
 †Eumetria
 †Eumetria sulcata
 †Eunemacanthus
 †Eunemacanthus keytei
  †Euomphalus
 †Euomphalus plummeri – or unidentified related form
 †Euphemites
 †Euphemites crenulatus
 †Euphemites fremontensis – type locality for species
 †Euphemites luxuriosus
 †Euphemites sacajawensis
 †Euphemites sparciliratus
 †Euphemitopsis
 †Euphemitopsis multinodosa
 †Euphemitopsis subpapillosa
 †Eurekia

F

  †Favosites
 †Favosites prolificus – or unidentified comparable form
 †Flexaria – tentative report
 †Foerstephyllum
 †Fransonia
 †Fransonia wyomingensis

G

 †Gallatinospongia – type locality for genus
 †Gallatinospongia conica – type locality for species
 †Gastrioceras – report made of unidentified related form or using admittedly obsolete nomenclature
 †Gastrioceras williamsi – type locality for species
  †Genevievella
  †Geragnostus
 †Geragnostus insoltus
 †Girtyella
 †Girtyella indianensis – or unidentified comparable form
 †Girtypecten
 †Girtypecten sublaqueatus
 †Girtyspira
 †Girvanella
 †Glabrocingulum
 †Glabrocingulum alveozonum
 †Glabrocingulum coronatum
 †Glabrocingulum texanum
 †Glaphyraspis
 †Glaphyraspis occidentalis
  †Glikmanius
 †Glikmanius occidentalis
 †Globivalvulina
 †Globivalvulina bulloides – or unidentified loosely related form
 †Globoendothyra
 †Glyphaspis
 †Glyphaspis tetonensis
 †Glyptopleura
 †Glyptopleura multicostata
 †Gnamptorhynchos
 †Gnamptorhynchos prayi
 †Goniasma – tentative report
  †Goniatites – tentative report
 †Goniophora – tentative report
 †Gosseletina
 †Gosseletina idahoensis – type locality for species
 †Gosseletina permiana
 †Gosslingia
 †Gosslingia americana
 †Grandispora
 †Grandispora biornata – tentative report
 †Grandispora douglastownense
 †Grandispora macrotuberculata – tentative report
 †Grandispora micronata
 †Guizhoupecten
 †Guizhoupecten cheni
 †Guizhoupecten tubicostata – type locality for species

H

 †Hadragnostus
 †Hadragnostus modestus
 †Hamatus
 †Hamatus phosphoriensis
 †Healdia
 †Healdia ornata
 †Helemacanthus
 †Helemacanthus incurvus
 †Helicelasma
 †Helicelasma selectum
  †Helicoprion
 †Helicoprion davisii
 †Helodus
 †Helodus rugosus
 †Helodus subpolitus – type locality for species
 †Heslerodus
 †Heslerodus divergens
 †Hesperorthis
 †Hesperorthis pyramidalis – or unidentified comparable form
 †Heteropecten
 †Heteropecten vanvleeti – or unidentified comparable form
 †Hibbardella
 †Hiscobeccus
 †Hiscobeccus gigas
 †Holcacephalus
 †Holcacephalus tenerus
 †Hollina
 †Hollina occidentalis
 †Hollinella
 †Hollinella typica
 †Holophragma – report made of unidentified related form or using admittedly obsolete nomenclature
 †Homagnostus
 †Hormotoma
 †Hostimella
 †Housia
 †Hustedia
 †Hustedia phosphoriensis
 †Hydroscorpius – type locality for genus
 †Hydroscorpius denisoni – type locality for species
  †Hyolithes
 †Hyolithes primordialis
 †Hypergonia
 †Hypergonia percostata
 †Hypseloconus
 †Hypseloconus simplex
 †Hypsiptycha
 †Hypsiptycha anticostiense
 †Hypsiptycha anticostiensis
 †Hypsiptycha neenah – or unidentified comparable form
 †Hystriculina

I

 †Ianthinopsis
 †Idiognathoides
 †Idiognathoides corrugata
 †Idiognathoides sinuata
 †Illaenurus
 †Illaenurus priscus
 †Incrustatospongia – type locality for genus
 †Incrustatospongia superficiala – type locality for species
 †Inflatia
 †Inflatia lovei
 †Ithyektyphus
 †Ithyektyphus tetonensis

J

  †Janassa
 †Janassa angularis
 †Janassa unguicula
 †Janassa unguiformis
 †Jonesina
 †Jonesina carbonifera
 †Josina – type locality for genus
 †Josina festiva – type locality for species
 †Juresania

K

 †Kaibabella
 †Kaibabella basilica – type locality for species
  †Kendallina
 †Kendallina eryon
 †Kingstonia
 †Kingstonia walcotti
 †Kionoceras
 †Kochoceras
 †Komiella
 †Komiella ostiolata
 †Kormagnostus
 †Kormagnostus seclusus
 †Kyphocephalus

L

 †Lambeoceras
 †Lamellospira
 †Lamellospira alveozona – type locality for species
 †Lampraspis
 †Lampraspis tuberculata
  †Leclercqia
 †Leclercqia complexa
 †Leiorhynchus
 †Leiorhynchus weeksi
 †Lepidocyclus
 †Leptochondria
 †Leptochondria curtocardinalis – type locality for species
 †Leptodesma
 †Levizygopleura
 †Levizygopleura inornata – or unidentified comparable form
 †Limipecten – tentative report
 †Linglella
 †Linglella modesta
  †Lingula
 †Lingula carbonaria
  †Lingulella
 †Lingulella modesta
 †Linnarssonella
 †Linnarssonella girtyi
 †Linnarssonella girtyyi
 †Linoproductus
 †Linoproductus eastoni
 †Linoproductus planiventralis
 †Liosotella – tentative report
 †Lipinella
 †Liroceras
 †Lobocorallium
 †Lobocorallium trilobatum
 †Lonchocephalus
 †Lonchodus
 †Lyroschizodus
 †Lyroschizodus oklahomensis – or unidentified comparable form

M

 †Machaeracanthus
 †Machaeracanthus minor
 †Maclurina
 †Maclurina manitobensis
 †Maclurites
 †Macrostylocrinus
 †Macrostylocrinus wyomingensis – type locality for species
 †Marginifera
 †Marginifera haydenensis
 †Maryvillia
 †Meekella
 †Meekella attenuata
 †Meekopinna
 †Meekopinna sagitta
 †Meekospira
 †Megamyonia
 †Megamyonia nitens
 †Meniscocoryphe
 †Meniscocoryphe platycephala
 †Meniscocryphe
 †Meniscocryphe platycephala
 †Mesolobus
  †Metacoceras
 †Metacoceras knighti – type locality for species
 †Metacoceras sulciferum – type locality for species
  †Meteoraspis
 †Microcoelodus
 †Microcoelodus breviconus
 †Microcoelodus unicornis
 †Microdoma – tentative report
 †Micromitra
 †Micromitra modesta
 †Millerella
 †Millerella pressa
 †Millerella pura – or unidentified related form
 †Miltonella
 †Miltonella shupei
 †Minicephalus – type locality for genus
 †Minicephalus primus – type locality for species
 †Modocia
 †Monocheilus
 †Monocheilus truncatus
 †Mooreoceras – tentative report
 †Mourlonia
 †Multithecopora
 †Multithecopora amsdenensis
 †Myalina
 †Myalina aviculoides
 †Myalina sinuata – type locality for species
 †Myalina wyomingensis

N

 †Nahannagnostus
 †Nahannagnostus nganasanicus
 †Nasutimena
 †Nasutimena fluctuosa
  †Naticopsis
 †Naticopsis judithae
 †Naticopsis kaibabensis
 †Naticopsis marthaae – or unidentified comparable form
 †Natiria
 †Natiria americana
 †Neoarchaediscus
 †Neoarchaediscus incertus
 †Neoarchaediscus parvus
 †Neocoleodus
 †Neocoleodus spicatus
 †Neokoninckophylllum
 †Neokoninckophylllum inconstans
 †Neokoninckophyllum
 †Neokoninckophyllum hamatilis
  †Neospirifer
 †Neospirifer bakeri
 †Nixonella
   Nucula – tentative report
 †Nuculopsis
 †Nuculopsis montpelierensis
 †Nuculopsis poposiensis – type locality for species
 †Nuculopsis pulchra
 †Nuferella – tentative report
 †Nuferella puncta

O

 †Obliquipecten
 †Ocnerorthis
 †Ocnerorthis cooperi
 †Oepikina
 †Oepikina pergibbosa – or unidentified comparable form
 †Oistodus
 †Oistodus curvatus
  †Olenoides
 †Olenoides incertus – or unidentified comparable form
 †Onchus
 †Onchus penetrans
 †Onchus peracutus
 †Orbiculoidea
 †Orbiculoidea missouriensis
 †Orbiculoidea utahensis
 †Orbiculoidea wyomingensis
 †Oreaspis
 †Oreaspis ampla
 †Oreaspis dunklei
 †Oreaspis williamsi
 †Oriocrassatella
 †Oriocrassatella elongata – type locality for species
 †Orthonema
 †Orthotetes
 †Orthotetes kaskaskiensis
 †Orthothetina
 †Orthothetina amsdenensis
 †Otusia
 †Ovatia
 †Ovatia croneisi
 †Ovatia muralis
 †Ozarkodina

P

 †Paladin
 †Paladin moorei
 †Palaeoneilo
 †Palaeoneilo mcchesneyana
 †Palaeonubecularia – or unidentified comparable form
 †Palaeophyllum
 †Palaeophyllum gracile
 †Palaeophyllum humei
 †Palaeotextularia
 †Palaeotextularia consobrina – or unidentified loosely related form
 †Palaeotextularia longiseptata – or unidentified loosely related form
 †Paleocuticularia – type locality for genus
 †Paleocuticularia perforata – type locality for species
 †Paleofavosites
 †Paleofavosites prayi
 †Paleyoldia
 †Paleyoldia amsdenensis
 †Paltodus
 †Parabolinoides
 †Parabolinoides expansus
 †Paracedaria
 †Paracedarina
 †Paractinoceras
 †Parajuresania
 †Parajuresania nebrascensis
 †Parallelodon
 †Parallelodon multistriatus – or unidentified comparable form
 †Paraschizodus – type locality for genus
 †Paraschizodus elongatus – type locality for species
 †Paraspiriferina
 †Paraspiriferina formulosa – type locality for species
 †Parehmania
 †Parehmania inornata
 †Peripetoceras
 †Permophorus
 †Permophorus albequus
 †Permophorus pricei – type locality for species
 †Pernopecten
 †Petrocrania
 †Pharkidonotus
 †Pharkidonotus altitropis – type locality for species
 †Phestia
 †Phestia perumbonata
 †Pimmacanthus
 †Pimmacanthus inequistriatus
  †Plaesiomys
 †Plaesiomys rockymontana – or unidentified related form
 †Plagioglypta
 †Planoendothyra
 †Planospirodiscus
   †Platyceras
 †Platyceras yochelsoni – type locality for species
  †Platystrophia
 †Platystrophia equiconvexa
 †Plethopletis
 †Plethopletis arbucklensis
 †Pleurosiphonella
 †Pleurosiphonella drummondi
 †Polidevcia
 †Polidevcia bellistriata
 †Polidevcia obesa
 †Polycaulodus
 †Polycaulodus bidentatus
 †Posidonia
 †Praearcturus
 †Proagnostus – or unidentified comparable form
 †Procostatoria
 †Procostatoria sexradiata
 †Prodentalium
 †Prodentalium canna
 †Protaspis
 †Protaspis brevispina
 †Protaspis mcgrewi
 †Protaspis ovata
 †Protaspis sculpta
 †Protaspis transversa
 †Prototreta
 †Pseudagnostus
 †Pseudagnostus douvillei
 †Pseudagnostus prolongus – or unidentified comparable form
 †Pseudobythocypris – tentative report
 †Pseudobythocypris amsdenensis
 †Pseudoendothyra
 †Pseudoendothyra kremenskensis – or unidentified loosely related form
 †Pseudogastrioceras
 †Pseudoglomospira
 †Pseudomatthevia
 †Pseudomatthevia conica
  †Pseudomelania – tentative report
 †Pseudomonotis
 †Pseudomonotis likharevi
 †Pseudorthoceras
 †Pseudorthoceras knoxense
 †Pseudovidrioceras
 †Pseudovidrioceras girtyi
 †Pseudozygopleura
 †Pseudozygopleura croneisi
 †Pseudozygopleura girtyi – or unidentified comparable form
  †Psilophyton
 †Psilophyton wyomingense – type locality for species
 †Pterocephalia
 †Pterocephalia bridgei
 †Pteroconus
 †Pteroconus gracilis
 †Pugnoides
 †Pugnoides quinqeuplecis
 †Pugnoides quinqueplecis
 †Pulsia
 †Pulsia delira

R

 †Rawlinsella
 †Renalcis
  †Renalia
 †Renalia dorfii – type locality for species
 †Reticulariina
 †Reticulariina browni
 †Reticulatia
 †Reticulatia americana
 †Retispira
 †Retispira fragilis
 †Retispira modesta
 †Retispira tenuilineata – or unidentified loosely related form
 †Retispira textiliformis
 †Retusotriletes
 †Retusotriletes actinomorphus
 †Retusotriletes dubiosus
 †Retusotriletes simplex
 †Retusotriletes warringtonii
 †Rhynchotrema
 †Rhynchotrema iowense
 †Rhynoleichus
 †Rhynoleichus weeksi
 †Rugomena
 †Rugomena planocorrugata

S

 †Sallya
 †Sallya linsa
 †Sanguinolites
 †Sansabella
 †Sansabella reversa
 †Sargentina – tentative report
 †Sargentina amsdenensis
  †Saukiella
 †Saukiella pyrene
 †Sawdonia
 †Sawdonia wyomingense – type locality for species
 †Scapallina
 †Scapallina phosphoriensis
 †Scaphellina
 †Scaphellina concinna – type locality for species
 †Sceptropora
 †Sceptropora facula – or unidentified comparable form
 †Schizodus
 †Schizodus affinis – or unidentified related form
 †Schizodus alpinus
 †Schizodus altus – type locality for species
 †Schizodus bifidus
 †Schizodus canalis
 †Schizodus depressus – or unidentified comparable form
 †Schizodus ferrieri
 †Schizodus subovatus
 †Schizodus wheeleri – or unidentified comparable form
 †Schizodus wyomingensis – type locality for species
 †Schizophoria
 †Schizophoria depressa
 †Schizophoria texana – or unidentified comparable form
 †Schuchertella
 †Schuchertella poposiensis – or unidentified comparable form
 †Scoloconcha
 †Scoloconcha globosa
 †Sedgewickia – tentative report
 †Semicircularea
 †Semicircularea arcuata
 †Shansiella
 †Shedhornia – type locality for genus
 †Shedhornia ornata – type locality for species
 †Shishaella
 †Shishaella moreyi
  Solemya
 †Soleniscus
 †Soleniscus altonensis – or unidentified related form
 †Soleniscus primogenius
 †Soleniscus typicus
 †Solenochilus
 †Solenochilus brammeri – or unidentified comparable form
 †Sphenalosia – type locality for genus
 †Sphenalosia smedleyi – type locality for species
 †Sphenosteges
 †Sphenosteges hispidus
 †Sphondylophyton
 †Sphondylophyton hyenioides
  †Spiriferina
 †Spiriferina kentuckensis – or unidentified comparable form
 †Spyroceras
 †Stacheia
 †Stacheoides
 †Stearoceras
 †Stearoceras phosphoriense
 †Stegocoelia
 †Stenolobulites
 †Stenolobulites simulator
 †Stenopilus
 †Stenopilus glaber
 †Stenopoceras
 †Stenopoceras abundum – type locality for species
 †Steroconus
 †Steroconus gracilis
 †Steroconus plenus
 †Steroconus robustus
 †Straparollus
 †Streblopteria
 †Streblopteria montpelierensis
 †Streplopteria
 †Streptelasma
 †Streptelasma trilobatum
 †Streptognathodus
 †Streptognathodus parvus
 †Streptognathus
 †Strobeus
 †Strobeus intercalaris – or unidentified comparable form
 †Strobeus paludinaeformis – or unidentified comparable form
  †Strophomena
 †Strophostylus
 †Stutchburia
 †Syspacheilus

T

 †Taenicephalus
 †Taenicephalus shumardi
 †Tainoceras
 †Tainoceras wyomingense – type locality for species
 †Talbotina
 †Tapinotomaria – tentative report
 †Tatonkacystis – type locality for genus
 †Tatonkacystis codyensis – type locality for species
 †Tetrataxis
 †Timaniella
 †Timaniella pseudocamerata
 †Torynifer
 †Torynifer setiger
 †Trachelocrinus
 †Trachelocrinus resseri
 †Tracheolcrinas – tentative report
 †Trachydomia – tentative report
 †Trepeilopsis
 †Triarthropsis
 †Triarthropsis nitida – or unidentified comparable form
  †Tricrepicephalus
 †Tricrepicephalus coria
 †Triticites
 †Triticites ventricosus
 †Tuberitina
 †Turbinatocanina
 †Turbinatocaninia – tentative report

U

 †Uncaspis
 †Uncaspis limbata
  †Uranolophus
 †Uranolophus wyomingense

V

 †Virgaspongiella – type locality for genus
 †Virgaspongiella ramosa – type locality for species
 †Vnigripecten
 †Vnigripecten phosphaticus – type locality for species
 †Volvotextularia

W

 †Waagenella
 †Waagenella crassus – or unidentified comparable form
 †Warthia
 †Warthia fissus
 †Warthia waageni – or unidentified comparable form
 †Wellerella
 †Wellerella osagensis – or unidentified comparable form
 †Westonoceras
 †Whitfieldoceras
 †Wilkingia
 †Wilkingia terminalis
 †Wilkingia wyomingensis – type locality for species
 †Wilsonoceras
 †Winnipegoceras
 †Worthenia
 †Worthenia corrugata

X

 †Xestotrema
 †Xestotrema pulchrum

Y

 †Yakovlevia
 †Yakovlevia multistriatus
 †Yochelsonellisa
 †Yochelsonellisa eximia
 †Yunnania – tentative report

Z

 †Zaphrentites – tentative report
 †Zellerina
 †Zellerina discoidea
 †Zygospira
 †Zygospira aequivalvis

References
 

Paleozoic
Wyoming